Inge Maux (born 2 October 1944 in Mettmach, Upper Austria as Ingeborg Christine Wöchtl) is an Austrian actress.

Life 
Maux grew up mainly in Upper Austria. Her uncle was the composer Richard Maux (1893-1971), who supported her artistically and convinced her parents that she should be allowed to attend the Vienna Drama School Krauss. She also took his surname as her stage name.

Acting engagements have taken her to the Schauspiel Köln and the Schauspielhaus Zürich and she has also appeared in various musicals, such as Yente in Anatevka at the Zürich Opera House, Theater an der Wien in Chicago and as Maria Wartberg in Ich war noch niemals in New York at the Raimund Theater. Guest performances brought her to the Residenz Theater Munich, to the Ernst Deutsch Theater in Hamburg, to the Theater in der Josefstadt and to the Theater in der Drachengasse.

Maux was a member of the Vienna Volkstheater, where she played the role of Betty Dullfeet in The Resistible Rise of Arturo Ui in the seasons 2010/11 to 2013/14, in Harvey the role of Veta Louise Simmons, in Mr Puntila and his Man Matti Laina and in Felix Mitterers play Du bleibst bei mir the role of Miss Krottensteiner.

In the summer of 2015 she played the White Queen in Alice in Wonderland at the summer games in Melk, in 2016 she appeared in front of the camera for the ORF Landkrimi Höhenstraße and for an episode of the fifth season of Schnell ermittelt.

In the TV series Braunschlag she played the role of Herta Tschach's mother, in Paradise: Love by Ulrich Seidl she played Teresa's girlfriend, in Jack by Elisabeth Scharang she was seen as Jack's mother. In Der Blunzenkönig she played a leading role alongside Karl Merkatz as Rösli, in the ZDFneo series Blockbustaz she played the role of Hella.

In her second marriage, Inge Maux is married to the actor Manfred Schmid (born 4 April 1940), with whom she lives in Artstetten in Lower Austria and organises special evenings with Jewish music. Besides her work as an actress, she also works as a photographer and painter.

Achievements 

 Deutsche Akademie für Fernsehen: Nomination in the category Actress-supporting role for Spuren des Bösen – Schande.
 Österreichischer Filmpreis 2016: Nomination in the category Best female supporting role for Jack.

Filmography 

 1978: Grüne Witwen sind sie alle!
 1982: Der grüne Stern
 1986: Rosa und Rosalind
 1988: Einstweilen wird es Mittag
 1990: Die Philosophie der Ameise
 1991: Sehnsüchte oder Es ist alles unheimlich leicht
 1996: Kaisermühlen Blues
 1997: Die Schuld der Liebe
 1998: Schlosshotel Orth
 1998: Die 3 Posträuber
 2005: Moral
 2006–2011: Tom Turbo (tv show, four episodes)
 since 2008: Saugut
 2010: Seine Mutter und ich
 2010: Willkommen in Wien
 2010: Tiger-Team – Der Berg der 1000 Drachen
 2011: Anfang 80
 2011: fauner consulting
 2012: Braunschlag
 2012: Paradise: Love
 2013: Zweisitzrakete
 2013: Paul Kemp – Alles kein Problem – Die Falle
 2014: Boys Like Us
 2014: Spuren des Bösen – Schande
 2015: Vecchi Pazzi
 2015: Jack
 2015: Der Blunzenkönig
 2015: Der Metzger und der Tote im Haifischbecken
 2016: Blockbustaz
 2016: Landkrimi – Höhenstraße
 2017: Schnell ermittelt – Gudrun Schatzinger
 2017: Sommerhäuser
 2017: Dahoam is Dahoam
 2017: SOKO Donau – Ich sehe was, was du nicht siehst
 2018: Murer – Anatomie eines Prozesses
 2018: The Awakening of Motti Wolkenbruch as Mame

References

External links 
 

Austrian actresses
1944 births
Living people